Zarechnoye is a rural locality (a selo) in Tyagunsky Selsoviet, Kytmanovsky District, Altai Krai, Russia. The population was 224 as of 2013. There are 9 streets.

Geography 
Zarechnoye is located on the Chumysh River, 20 km north of Kytmanovo (the district's administrative centre) by road. Dmitro-Titovo is the nearest rural locality.

References 

Rural localities in Kytmanovsky District